The men's singles tennis event at the 2018 Asian Games took place at the Tennis Court of Jakabaring Sport City, Palembang, Indonesia from 19 to 25 August 2018.

Yoshihito Nishioka was the defending champion, but chose not to compete. Denis Istomin won the gold medal, defeating Wu Yibing in the final. Prajnesh Gunneswaran and Lee Duck-hee won the bronze medals.

Schedule
All times are Western Indonesia Time (UTC+07:00)

Results
Legend
r — Retired
WO — Won by walkover

Finals

Top half

Section 1

Section 2

Bottom half

Section 3

Section 4

References
 Draw

External links
Official website

Tennis at the 2018 Asian Games